Eucalyptus raveretiana, commonly known as the black ironbox, is a species of small to medium-sized tree that is endemic to Queensland. It has rough, fibrous or flaky bark on the trunk and larger branches, smooth pale grey bark above, lance-shaped leaves, flower buds in groups of seven on a branched peduncle, white flowers and small, hemispherical fruit.

Description
It has thick, rough, flaky and fibrous, fissured dark grey bark on the trunk and larger branches, smooth grey to cream-coloured bark on branches thinner that . Flowering occurs from December to March and the flowers are white.

Taxonomy and naming
Eucalyptus raveretiana was first formally described in 1877 by Ferdinand von Mueller in his book Fragmenta phytographiae Australiae. The specific epithet honours a French public servant,  C. Raveret-Wattel.

Distribution and habitat
Black ironbox grows in forest and woodland along creeks and rivers between Rockhampton and Ayr and inland to the rivers north of Duaringa.

Conservation status
This eucalypt is classified as "vulnerable" under the Australian Government Environment Protection and Biodiversity Conservation Act 1999 and the Queensland Government Nature Conservation Act 1992. The main threats to the species are habitat disturbance during timber harvesting operations and smothering by rubber vine (Cryptostegia grandiflora).

See also
List of Eucalyptus species

References

Trees of Australia
raveretiana
Myrtales of Australia
Flora of Queensland
Taxa named by Ferdinand von Mueller
Plants described in 1877